Danei District is a rural district of about 8,948 residents in Tainan, Taiwan.

History 
Formerly home to the Tevorangh Taiwanese Plains Aborigines, a branch of the Siraya people (Baccloangh subtribe).

After the handover of Taiwan from Japan to the Republic of China in 1945, Danei was organized as a rural township of Tainan County. On 25 December 2010, Tainan County merged with Tainan City and Danei was upgraded to a district of the city.

Administrative divisions 
The district consists of Shihu, Shilin, Shicheng, Neijiang, Danei, Neiguo, Toushe, Huanhu, Erxi and Quxi Village.

Tourist attractions 
 Nanyuan Recreational Farm
 Sanhu Lake
 Siangong Temple
 Tainan Astronomical Education Area
 Tainan Science Education Museum
 Tsou Ma Lai Farm
 World of Water Lilies
 Wushantou Prehistoric Remains

References

External links 

 

Districts of Tainan